A CYYM filter is a color filter array. It has one cyan, two yellow, and one magenta element. Developed by Kodak, it was used in the Kodak DCS 620x and DCS 720x DSLRs.

References

Color filter array